This is a list of federative units in Brazil by Urban and Rural rate, the numbers are 2010 census of the IBGE

References 

Lists of states of Brazil
Brazil geography-related lists